KNVN (channel 24) is a television station licensed to Chico, California, United States, serving the Chico–Redding market as an affiliate of NBC and Telemundo. It is owned by Maxair Media, which maintains a shared services agreement (SSA) with Allen Media Broadcasting, owner of dual CBS/CW+ affiliate KHSL-TV (channel 12, also licensed to Chico), for the provision of certain services. Both stations share studios at the McClung Broadcast Center at the intersection of Eaton Road and Silverbell Road on the northwest side of Chico, while KNVN's transmitter is located northeast of Red Bluff.

History
Channel 24 first hit the airwaves on September 24, 1985 as KCPM, making the northern Sacramento Valley one of the last regions of the country with full network service. The station was owned by the broadcasting unit of television production company Telepictures (later renamed Lorimar-Telepictures) It also brought a full NBC affiliate to the area for the first time since KRCR-TV (channel 7) switched from NBC to ABC in 1978. In that interim period between 1978 and 1985, assorted NBC programs were available via off-hours clearances from both KHSL and KRCR. It originally broadcast from the former KHSL-TV and Radio studios located on East 4th Street and Wall Street in Chico. Lorimar-Telepictures sold the station along with two of its stations (KSPR in Springfield, Missouri and KMID in Midland, Texas to Goltrin Communications in 1987; which in turn sold it to Davis-Goldfarb Communications in 1988.

KCPM signed on during a very prosperous time for NBC (as it rose to become the top rated network), and it did quite well for the first several years on the air. But by 1998, the station was sinking in debt and on the verge of closing down. At this point, KHSL stepped in, not wanting to see the loss of full network service in the area. Then-owner Grapevine Communications sold the station to Evans Broadcasting, which changed the calls to the current KNVN on August 10, and turned the station's operations over to KHSL (owned by Catamount Broadcasting at the time) under a shared services agreement.

A report in the Chico News & Review on January 3, 2013 said that there were rumors of a sale of KHSL and KNVN to Nexstar Broadcasting Group. However, on February 6, KNVN was instead sold to K4 Media Holdings. Operations of the station were taken over by GOCOM Media, LLC, which concurrently bought KHSL. The FCC approved the sale on April 19; it was consummated on May 6. On July 14, 2015, it was announced that K4 would sell KNVN to Maxair Media. Concurrently, GOCOM sold KHSL-TV to Heartland Media, through its USA Television Holdings joint venture with MSouth Equity Partners, for $40 million; Heartland provided services to KNVN and sold up to 15 percent of channel 24's advertising time. The sale was completed on December 1.

KNVN-DT2

KNVN-DT2, branded on-air as Telemundo Chico-Redding, is the Telemundo-affiliated second digital subchannel of KNVN, broadcasting in 720p high definition on channel 24.2. It is the first local Spanish-language station in the Northstate to broadcast a locally produced Spanish-language newscast called Acción Noticiero Telemundo with Josh Navarro and Daniela Contreras as anchors.

The subchannel's Telemundo affiliation originally started with KXVU-LP (channel 17) in 2006. It was founded by Chester Smith of Sainte Partners II, L.P., joining sister station KUCO-LP (their Univision affiliate) as the only two Spanish-language stations in the North Valley until they also founded KKTF-LD (the UniMás affiliate). After the sale of Sainte's assets to Bonten Media Group, the new owners sold the rights to Telemundo to K4 Media Holdings and moved the network from KXVU's channel 17 to channel 24.2. (KXVU has since become an affiliate of Antenna TV).

News operation
KHSL and KNVN currently share a single news operation.

KCPM aired its own newscasts for a time after going on the air. After Grapevine sold the station, KNVN relaunched its own news department, this time targeted toward younger viewers. However, this attempt at local news failed to make much of an impact. Finally, the news departments of both stations formally merged into a single news department in February 2000.

Technical information

Subchannels

The station's digital signal is multiplexed:

KNVN subchannels

K31ND-D subchannels

Analog-to-digital conversion
KNVN shut down its analog signal, over UHF channel 24, on December 22, 2008. The station's digital signal relocated from its pre-transition UHF channel 36 to channel 24.

References

External links
 Official website
 Telemundo page at Action News Now website

Entertainment Studios
NBC network affiliates
NVN
Television channels and stations established in 1985
1985 establishments in California